The German names Weissenburg and Weißenburg can refer to:
 Weißenburg in Bayern in Germany
 
 Alba Iulia in Romania
 Wissembourg in France
 Weissenburg Abbey, Alsace, former Benedictine abbey at Wissembourg
 Weissenburg Castle, a ruined castle in the municipality of Därstetten of the Canton of Bern in Switzerland
 , a resort in the Niedersimmental, above Lake Thun, Switzerland
  (formerly Kuranstalt Weissenburg), a former spa in Därstetten, Canton Bern, Switzerland
 Weissenburg, Ontario in Waterloo County, Ontario, Canada